Gregory is an English, Scottish and Slovenian surname, variants of the name include McGregor, MacGregor, Gregor, Gregson, Gregg, Grigg, Greig and may refer to:

 Adam Gregory, Canadian entertainer
 Alyse Gregory (1884-1967), American suffragist and writer
 Andre Gregory
 Andy Gregory, English rugby league player          
 Augustus Charles Gregory, Australian explorer
 Benji Gregory
 Bernard Gregory, French physicist, CERN Director General
 Bob Gregory (disambiguation), multiple people
 Brad Stephan Gregory
 Bud Gregory
 Caspar René Gregory (1846–1917), German theologian
 Celia Gregory
 Charles Hutton Gregory, British civil engineer
 Christine Gregory, British sculptor
 Conal Gregory
 Cynthia Gregory
 Dave Gregory, Australian cricketer
 Dave Gregory, guitarist for XTC
 David Gregory (mathematician), Scottish mathematician
 David Gregory (BBC)
 David Gregory, American journalist
 David Gregory, English footballer
 Deborah Gregory
 Derek Gregory
 Dick Gregory (1932-2017), American comedian, social activist, writer, and entrepreneur
 Dorian Gregory
 Doris Gregory, Canadian author
 Dudley S. Gregory
 Duncan Farquharson Gregory
 Earle D. Gregory
 Ed Gregory
 Edward John Gregory
 Francis Gregory, American naval captain, eponym of two ships named USS Gregory
 Francis Thomas Gregory
 Frederick D. Gregory
 Garland Gregory (1919–2011), American football player
 Gayson Gregory, Antiguan and Barbudan footballer
 Geena Gregory, fictional character
 Herbert B. Gregory, Virginia judge
 Herbert E. Gregory, American geologist and geographer
 Horace Gregory
 Howard Gregory
 Jack Gregory (disambiguation), multiple people
 Jackson Gregory (1882–1943), American teacher, journalist, and writer.
 James Gregory (disambiguation), multiple people
 Jecon Gregory a nomadic artist
 John Gregory (disambiguation), multiple people
 Jonathan M. Gregory
 Joseph Gregory (disambiguation), multiple people
 Joshua Gregory
 Julie Gregory
 Julius Gregory, (born 1988), an American football player
 Ken Gregory
 Lee Gregory (baseball)
 Lee Gregory (footballer)
 Louis George Gregory, Hand of the Cause in the Bahá'í Faith
 Masten Gregory
 Matthew Gregory (disambiguation), several people
 Maundy Gregory
 Melissa Gregory, American figure skater
 Michael Gregory (actor), American actor born Gary Meimar
 Mike Gregory (1964–2022), English professional rugby league footballer
 Myel Gregory muu
 Natalie Gregory
 Ned Gregory
 Noble Jones Gregory
 Olinthus Gregory, English mathematician
 Paul Gregory (disambiguation), several people
 Philip Herries Gregory (1907–1986), British mycologist and phytopathologist
 Philippa Gregory, Kenyan-English writer
 Richard Gregory, British psychologist
 Roberta Gregory
 Roger Gregory, American judge
 Roger Gregory,  programmer, one of earliest pioneers of hypertext
 Ross Gregory
 Sara Beth Gregory, Kentucky politician
 Scott Gregory (disambiguation)
 Stephen Gregory (disambiguation)
 Susanna Gregory, pseudonym
 Syd Gregory
 Thea Gregory
 Theodore Gregory (1890–1970), British economist
 Thomas Watt Gregory, American Attorney General
Tom Gregory (1927-2006), American TV and radio personality
Tom Gregory (producer) (born 1960), American entertainer and commentator
Tom Gregory (swimmer) (born 1976), long-distance swimmer as a child
 Tommy Gregory, American politician
 Tony Gregory
 Troy Gregory
 T. Ryan Gregory, Canadian scientist
 Victoria Welby-Gregory, Lady Welby
 Walter E. Gregory (1857-1918), American physician
 Will Gregory
 William G. Gregory 
 William King Gregory (1876–1970), American zoologist
 William S. Gregory
 William Voris Gregory
 Wilton Daniel Gregory
In England the surname is well represented in Derbyshire, Lincolnshire, Northamptonshire, Hampshire, Lancashire, Cheshire and Yorkshire, in Scotland the surname is well represented in Lanarkshire, Angus, Aberdeenshire, Moray, Fife, and Midlothian, and in the United States the surname is well represented in Tennessee, Kentucky, North Carolina, South Carolina, Michigan, Ohio and Virginia.

See also
 Gregory (disambiguation)
 Gregor (surname)
 Krikorian

it:Gregory

English-language surnames
Surnames from given names